The football (soccer) Campeonato Brasileiro Série C 2001, the third level of Brazilian National League, was played from September 8 to December 15, 2001. The competition had 65 clubs and two of them were promoted to Série B.

Etti Jundiaí finished the final phase group with most points and was declared 2001 Brazilian Série C champions, claiming the promotion to the 2002 Série B along with Mogi Mirim, the runners-up. the third-placed team, Guarany de Sobral, was also promoted after Malutrom withdrew from the 2002 Série B.

Stages of the competition

First stage

Group A (AC-AP-AM-PA-RO-RR)

Group B (CE-MA-PI-TO)

Group C (PB-RN)

Group D (AL-PE-SE)

Group E (DF-GO-MT-MS)

Group F (BA-ES)

Group G (RJ-SP)

Group H (MG)

Group I (PR-RJ-SP)

Group J (PR-RS-SC)

Second stage
Group 1 (AP-CE-PB-RR)

Group 2 (AL-DF-GO-RN-SE)

Group 3 (BA-MG-RJ-SP)

Group 4 (MG-PR-RS-SC-SP)

Final stage

Sources
 rsssf.com

Campeonato Brasileiro Série C seasons
2001 in Brazilian football leagues